Grammar School in Dubai is a private school located in Al Garhoud, Dubai, UAE. The school is managed by Athena Education. Grammar School follows the British National Curriculum, offering the elementary school courses for students from FS1 up to Year 6, the middle school programme leading up to the IGCSE programme for students from Year 7 to Year 11, and the Advanced Subsidiary (AS) and A2 level programmes for students in Year 12 and Year 13. The English National Curriculum school caters to K-12 students who are an international group but are predominantly Pakistani and Indian.

History 
The school was established in 1970. However, the Knowledge and Human Development Authority inspectorate published its founding in 1974. The school, founded by the D'Cruz family in 1970s, was purchased by Athena Education in November 2015.

References

External links
 

1970 establishments in the Trucial States
Educational institutions established in 1970
Schools in Dubai